Fancy were an early-mid-1970s pop group. The band was made up of session musicians produced by Mike Hurst. They had a surprise U.S. hit single in 1974 with a version of the classic "Wild Thing", peaking at #14 on the Billboard Hot 100 and #31 in Australia. They also had a second U.S. hit with "Touch Me", peaking at #19 and #97 in Australia. They were initially fronted by Penthouse Pet Helen Caunt and later Annie Kavanagh. Ray Fenwick, formerly of The Spencer Davis Group, joined Fancy in 1974. Fancy's song "Feel Good" from the album Wild Thing has been sampled over one hundred times, most notably by the Beastie Boys on the song "3-Minute Rule" off their album Paul's Boutique (1989).

Album discography
Wild Thing

"Wild Thing"
"Love for Sale"
"Move On"
"I Don't Need Your Love"
"One Night"
"Touch Me"
"U.S. Surprise"
"Between the Devil and Me"
"I'm a Woman"
"Feel Good"

Turns You On (UK release title:  Something to Remember)

"She's Riding the Rock Machine"
"I Was Made to Love Him"
"You've Been in Love Too Long"
"Something to Remember"
"Everybody's Cryin' Mercy"
"The Tour Song"
"Stop"

Both albums were re-released on a single CD, circa 2002, on the UK-based Angel Air record label. Turns You On was expanded with additional tracks and B-sides for this release.

A U.S. CD release of Wild Thing came out on the Collectables reissue label in 2006.

References

External links
 Ray Fenwick: Fancy
 Mo Foster
 Angel Air Records
 Fancy licensing
 

Musical groups established in 1973
Musical groups disestablished in 1975
English pop music groups
1973 establishments in England
1975 disestablishments in England
Big Tree Records artists
Arista Records artists